Thomas Taylor may refer to:

Military
Thomas H. Taylor (1825–1901), Confederate States Army colonel
Thomas Happer Taylor (1934–2017), U.S. Army officer; military historian and author; triathlete
Thomas Taylor (Medal of Honor) (born 1834), American Civil War sailor and Medal of Honor recipient
Thomas William Taylor (British Army officer) (1782–1854)

Politicians
Sir Thomas Taylor, 2nd Baronet (1657–1696), English MP for Maidstone
Sir Thomas Taylor, 1st Baronet (1662–1736), Anglo-Irish MP
Sir Thomas Taylor, 2nd Baronet, of Kells (1686–1757), Anglo-Irish MP
Thomas Taylour, 1st Earl of Bective (1724–1795), Irish peer and politician
Thomas Edward Taylor (1811–1883), British Conservative Party politician
Thomas Taylor (Liberal politician) (1851–1916), British Liberal Party politician, MP for Bolton, 1912–1916
Thomas William Taylor (1852–1924), politician in Manitoba, Canada
Thomas Baird Taylor (1860-1937), American farmer and politician in the Minnesota House of Representatives
Tommy Taylor (New Zealand politician) (1862–1911), New Zealand Member of Parliament
Thomas Taylor (Canadian politician) (1865–1947), politician in British Columbia, Canada
Thomas N. Taylor (1868–1950), Utah businessman and mayor of Provo, Utah
Thomas Taylor, Baron Taylor of Gryfe (1912–2001), British politician
Thomas Taylor, Baron Taylor of Blackburn (1929–2016), British life peer
Thomas C. Taylor (born 1948), American politician in the New Mexico House of Representatives
Thomas Taylor (Australian politician), member of the New South Wales Legislative Assembly

Religious
Thomas Fielden Taylor (1879–1937), New Zealand Anglican priest and city missioner
Thomas Taylor (Archdeacon of Ardagh), 18th-century Anglican priest in Ireland
Thomas Taylor (historian) (1858–1938), priest, historian and scholar of Celtic culture
Thomas Taylor (minister) (1738–1816), English Wesleyan minister and writer
Thomas Taylor (priest, 1576–1632), English Puritan
Thomas Taylor (priest, 1757–1808), Archdeacon of Chichester

Sports
Thomas Taylor (cricketer, born 1753) (1753–1806), English cricketer
Thomas Taylor (cricketer, born 1823), English cricketer
Tommy Taylor (Irish footballer), real name Thomas Taylor, Irish international footballer
Thomas Taylor (rugby league) (1911–1992), rugby league footballer of the 1930s and 1940s for England, Yorkshire, and Castleford
Thomas Taylor (weightlifter) (born 1899), British Olympic weightlifter

Others
Thomas Taylor (architect) (1777/78–1826), English artist and architect
Thomas Taylor (Australian architect) (19th century), Brisbane architect, designed the Wenley House
Thomas Taylor (artist) (born 1973), British children's author and illustrator
Thomas Taylor (botanist) (1786–1848), botanical author
Sir Thomas Taylor (chemist) (1895–1953), English chemist and university administrator
Thomas Taylor (microscopist), Scottish-American plant pathologist and microscopist
Thomas Glanville Taylor (1804–1848), English astronomer to HEIC, worked at the Madras Observatory
Thomas Griffith Taylor (1880–1963), geographer and Antarctic explorer
Sir Thomas Murray Taylor (1897–1962), principal of Aberdeen University
Thomas Taylor (neoplatonist) (1758–1835), English translator and Neoplatonist
Sir Thomas Wardlaw Taylor (1833–1917), Canadian lawyer and judge

See also
Tom Taylor (disambiguation)
Tommy Taylor (disambiguation)
Thomas Taylour (disambiguation)